Yanina Boleslavovna Zhejmo (29 May 1909 – 29 December 1987) was a Soviet actress of Polish origin. Her father was Polish and her mother was Russian. She appeared in more than 30 films between 1925 and 1955.

Partial filmography

 Mishki versus Yudenich (1925, Short) - youngster
 The Devil's Wheel  (1926, Short)
 The Overcoat (1926)
 Somebody Else's Coat (1927) - Circus actress
 Little Brother (1927, Short)
 The Club of the Big Deed (1927)
 The New Babylon (1929) - Therese, a seamstress
 Road to the World (1929)
 The Blue Express (1929)
 Alone (1931) - Young Teacher
 Man from Prison (1931)
 Seeking Asylum (1932)
 My Motherland (1933) - Olya
 Song of Happiness (1934) - Anuk
 Red Army Days (1935) - Kika, her friend
 Girl Friends (1936) - Asya
 Lenochka i vinograd (1936)
 Enemies (1938) - Nadya
 A Soldier Was Returning (1939) - Froska Kotko - Semen's sister
 Doctor Kalyuzhnyy (1939)
 Adventures of Korzinkina (1941, Short) - Korzinkina
 Boyevoy kinosbornik 12 (1942) - (segment "Vanka")
 Two Soldiers (1943) - Nurse
 The Young Fritz (1943) - Pchyolka (segment 'Pchyolka' / 'The bee')
 March–April (1944) - Cadet Katya Veselova
 We from the Urals (1944) - Vera Zavarina
 Cinderella (1947) - Cinderella
 Two Friends (1954) - Kostya's mother
 The Snow Queen (1957) - Gerda (voice) (final film role)

References

External links

1909 births
1987 deaths
People from Vawkavysk
People from Volkovyssky Uyezd
Soviet film actresses
Soviet voice actresses
Soviet people of Polish descent